The Blowing is the twelfth extended play by South Korean boy group Highlight. It was released on May 3, 2021 by Around Us Entertainment and contains six songs, including the single "Not The End".

Background 
Following the release of their 2018 EP Outro, Highlight went on a three-year hiatus while the members completed their mandatory military service. The Blowing marks the group's first release as a four-member group after the departure of Yong Jung-hyung in 2019.

Tracklist 

Adapted from Around US Entertainment press release.

Charts

References

External links 

2021 EPs
Korean-language EPs
Highlight (band) EPs